Charles Malcolm McDowell (born July 10, 1983) is an American film director and screenwriter. He is most known for his film The One I Love (2014).

Early life
McDowell was born on July 10, 1983, in Los Angeles, California to English actor Malcolm McDowell and American actress Mary Steenburgen. He has an older sister named Lilly (born January 22, 1981) and three younger half-brothers from his father's marriage to Kelley Kuhr. McDowell's stepfather is actor Ted Danson, who married Steenburgen in 1995. Since 2014, McDowell has had a running joke at Steenburgen's expense, claiming on numerous occasions on social media that his mother is actually actress Andie MacDowell.

Career
In 2011, McDowell's Twitter feed, @charliemcdowell, was described by Time as "one of the most hilarious Twitter feeds out there," and in 2013 Three Rivers Press published McDowell's book, Dear Girls Above Me, based on his Twitter feed.

His debut film, The One I Love, starring Mark Duplass and Elisabeth Moss had its world premiere at the Sundance Film Festival in January 2014, where shortly after it was acquired by RADiUS-TWC and released in August 2014. In 2015, McDowell directed Sarah Silverman's untitled HBO series pilot. The project was not picked up by the network. McDowell's next film, The Discovery, starred Rooney Mara, Jason Segel, and Robert Redford. The film premiered at the Sundance Film Festival and was acquired by Netflix for a global release in 2017.

In March 2017, filmmaker McDowell announced he was adapting author Don DeLillo's novel Zero K as a limited series for FX with Noah Hawley and Scott Rudin producing. McDowell previously directed an episode of Hawley's television series Legion, also for FX.

In 2019, McDowell directed the first and last episodes of the Showtime series On Becoming a God in Central Florida and also served as an executive producer. He also directed episodes of Silicon Valley, Dear White People, Tales from the Loop, and Dispatches from Elsewhere.

His next film, Gilded Rage, will be based on the infamous murder of investment banker Thomas Gilbert Sr. Bill Skarsgård and Christoph Waltz are set to portray the character in different periods of his life. Lily Collins is also set to star in the film.

Personal life

Filmography

Film

References

External links
 
 Dear Girls Above Me (Google Books)
 

1983 births
Living people
AFI Conservatory alumni
American male screenwriters
American people of Dutch descent
American people of English descent
American people of Scottish descent
American people of Welsh descent
Film directors from Los Angeles
Screenwriters from California
Writers from Los Angeles